The Affronteur class consisted of two 16-gun luggers that Michel Colin-Olivier laid down at Dieppe in August 1794 and that he launched in 1795 for the French Navy. The two vessels took part in the Expédition d'Irlande in 1796–1797. The Royal Navy captured both vessels in 1803 in separate actions. The Royal Navy took Affronteur into service as HMS Caroline in 1804. She patrolled the Irish Sea until she was broken up in 1807. Vautour was not taken into British service.

Description
The naval architect behind the Affronteur-class design is unknown but Winfield & Roberts suggest that the architect was probably Pierre-Alexandre-Laurent Forfait. The two vessels mounted sixteen  guns and had a complement of 87–120 officers and ratings.

Ships in class
{| class="wikitable" style="font-size:97%;"
|-
| colspan=9 align=center | Affronteur class|-
! Name
! Builder
! Laid down
! Launched
! Commissioned
! Fate
|-
| 
| rowspan=2 align=center | Michel Colin-Olivier, Dieppe, France
| 1794
| 18 July 1795
| November 1975
| Captured by Royal Navy 1803, became Caroline in 1804, and was broken up in 1807
|-
| 
| 1794
| August 1795
| November 1795
| Captured by Royal Navy 1803
|-
|}

Construction and career
Michel Colin-Olivier constructed two luggers in 1794 Dieppe and launched then in November 1795. Both participated in the Expédition d'Irlande in 1796–1797. 

On 18 May 1803,  captured Affronteur off Ushant. She came into British service on 14 September 1804 as HMS Caroline. There the vessel was measured at 158 tons burthen and armed with twelve  carronades and two 6-pounder guns. The lugger was re-rated as a gun-brig in British service. Caroline was deployed in the Irish Sea and taken out of service on 6 October 1807. The gun-brig was then broken up.

  captured Vautour on 25 November 1803 off Cape Finisterre while Vautour was returning from Santo Domingo. The Royal Navy did not take her into British service.

Citations

References
 
 
 
 

1795 ships
Ship classes of the French Navy
Captured ships